Sir William Wellington Cairns,  (1828 – 1888) was a British colonial administrator. He was the Governor of Queensland and the Governor of Trinidad.

Early life
Cairns was born in Belfast, Ireland on 3 March 1828 (as indicated on his grave stone). His parents were William Cairns, a property owner at Cultra, County Down and was a captain in the 14th Regiment, and his second marriage Matilda Beggs, daughter of Francis Beggs of the Grange, Malahide.

Trinidad and Australia
He served in various senior colonial civil service posts in the British Empire including Trinidad, moving due to health issues, before being appointed Governor of Queensland in January 1875. He held the post for two years before becoming the Administrator of South Australia in 1877.
Cairns was given a CMG in 1874, followed by a knighthood in 1877.

Later reflections of his contributions to colonial public life were not considered highly: 
Of all the pestilent "returned colonists" who misrepresent things Australian in London perhaps not one is equal as a nuisance to a retired Australian Governor.

Return

He subsequently returned to England where he died in London on 7 July 1888, unmarried. 
He is buried in a modest grave against the east wall of Brompton Cemetery near the north-east corner with Anna Maria Cairns, his sister.

Legacy

The city of Cairns in Queensland was named after him in 1876.

References

External links
Australian Dictionary of Biography : Sir William Wellington Cairns

1828 births
1888 deaths
Governors of British Trinidad
Governors of Queensland
Knights Commander of the Order of St Michael and St George
Governors of British Honduras
Colony of Queensland people
Governors of British Saint Christopher
Administrators of South Australia
British colonial governors and administrators in Oceania